Petar "Pera" Božović (born 22 May 1946) is a Serbian actor.

Selected filmography

Film

References

External links
 

Serbian male actors
1946 births
Living people
Male actors from Belgrade
People from Zemun
Serbian people of Montenegrin descent